GURPS Cliffhangers is a sourcebook for GURPS.

Contents
GURPS Cliffhangers is a GURPS campaign setting supplement describing how to run pulp-hero adventures set in the 1930s.

Publication history
GURPS Cliffhangers was written by Brian J. Underhill, with a cover by Miro Sinovcic and illustrations by Butch Burcham, and was published by Steve Jackson Games in 1989 as a 96-page book.

GURPS Cliffhangers was one of the broad genre books that followed the publication of the GURPS Basic Set.

Reception
Paul Mason reviewed GURPS Cliffhangers for Games International magazine, and gave it 3 stars out of 5, and stated that "Overall the artwork is weak, but the material is up to the usual GURPS standards. If I wanted to play a game set in this period, I'd be hard pressed to choose between this and Justice, Inc."

Reviews
GURPS Cliffhangers was reviewed in Alarums & Excursions #322.

References

Cliffhangers
Historical role-playing games
Pulp and noir period role-playing games
Role-playing game supplements introduced in 1989